The Adventures of Quentin Durward, Marksman of the Royal Guard is a 1988 Soviet adventure film directed by Sergey Tarasov.

Plot 
The film takes place in France in the 15th century. The film tells about the Scot, who is accepted into the guard. He must fulfill a difficult mission, which in fact is even more difficult than it seems.

Cast 
 Olga Kabo
 Aleksandr Koznov	
 Aleksandr Lazarev
 Aleksandr Yakovlev
 Aleksandr Pashutin
 Yury Kuznetsov		
 Leonid Kulagin
 Boris Khmelnitskiy	
 Pauls Butkevics
 Boris Khimichev

References

External links 
 

1988 films
1980s Russian-language films
Soviet adventure films
Films based on works by Walter Scott
1980s adventure films